Augustus Richard Norton (September 2, 1946 – February 20, 2019) was an American professor and army officer. He was a professor of international relations and anthropology at the Pardee School of Global Studies at Boston University. He was best known for his writing on Middle East politics, and as an occasional commentator on U.S. policy in the Middle East.

Background
Norton was born in New York City, New York in Brooklyn. He was a graduate of the Universities of Miami and Chicago. After being commissioned from the ranks in 1967, Norton served two combat tours in Vietnam as an airborne infantry officer. He later served as an unarmed United Nations observer with UNTSO in southern Lebanon. In 1981, he joined the faculty of West Point, where he became a professor of political science. He also taught West Point's only anthropology course. He retired in 1993 with the rank of colonel to join the faculty of Boston University. In 2006, he was an advisor the Iraq Study Group, also known as the Baker-Hamilton Commission.

Bibliography

 
 Civil Society in the Middle East, 2 vols., 1995, 1996, 2005
 Amal and the Shi'a: Struggle for the Soul of Lebanon, 1987

Critical studies and reviews of Norton's work
Hezbollah : a short history
 Max Rodenbeck, "Lebanon's Agony" The New York Review of Books 54/11 (28 June 2007) : 10-14

References

External links
 Webpage
 Blog
 

1946 births
2019 deaths
Writers from Brooklyn
Military personnel from New York City
University of Chicago alumni
University of Miami alumni
American foreign policy writers
American male non-fiction writers
Pardee School of Global Studies faculty
Boston University faculty
United States Military Academy faculty